España, rhapsody for orchestra ( or Rapsodie España) is the most famous orchestral composition by French composer Emmanuel Chabrier (1841–1894). Written in 1883 after a trip to Spain, it was dedicated to the conductor Charles Lamoureux, who conducted the first public performance on 4 November 1883, at the Théâtre du Château d’Eau for the Société des Nouveaux Concerts in Paris.

Background

From July to December 1882, Chabrier and his wife toured Spain, taking in San Sebastián, Burgos, Toledo, Sevilla, Granada, Málaga, Cádiz, Cordoba, Valencia, Zaragoza and Barcelona. His letters written during his travels are full of good humour, keen observation and his reactions to the music and dance he came across – and demonstrate his genuine literary gift. In a letter to Édouard Moullé (1845–1923); a long-time musician friend of Chabrier (himself interested in folk music of Normandy and Spain), the composer details his researches into regional dance forms, giving notated musical examples. A later letter to Lamoureux, from Cadiz, dated 25 October (in Spanish) has Chabrier writing that on his return to Paris he would compose an 'extraordinary fantasia' which would incite the audience to a pitch of excitement, and that even Lamoureux would be obliged to hug the orchestral leader in his arms, so voluptuous would be his melodies.

Although at first Chabrier worked on the piece for piano duet, this evolved into a work for full orchestra. Composed between January and August 1883, it was originally called Jota but this became España in October 1883. Encored at its first performance, and received well by the critics, it sealed Chabrier's fame overnight. The work was praised by Lecocq, Duparc, Hahn, de Falla (who did not think any Spanish composer had succeeded in achieving so genuine a version of the jota) and even Mahler (who declared it to be "the start of modern music" to musicians of the New York Philharmonic). Chabrier more than once described it as "a piece in F and nothing more".

Music

After a short guitar-like introduction, the first theme appears low on muted trumpets, and recurs four times during the piece. This is followed by a flowing second theme (bassoons, horns, cellos). Bassoons introduce another idea ben giocoso, sempre con impeto after which instrumental sections take up a dialogue with another highly rhythmic theme. After a return to the first theme, another flowing melody dolce espressivo on upper strings leads to a climax only broken by a marcato theme on trombones. Instrumental and thematic variants lead the piece to its ecstatic and joyous conclusion.

Chabrier's España inaugurated the vogue for hispanically flavoured music which found further expression in Debussy's Ibéria and Ravel's Rapsodie espagnole. Erik Satie parodied this trend in his piano piece Españaña from the suite Croquis et agaceries d'un gros bonhomme en bois (1913).

Orchestration
Strings; 3 flutes (1 piccolo), 2 oboes, 2 clarinets in B flat, 4 bassoons; 2 horns in F (chromatiques), 2 horns in C (ordinaires), 2 trumpets, 2 cornets à piston, 3 trombones, tuba; timpani, percussion (bass drum, cymbals, triangle, tambourine); 2 harps.

Metronome marking:  = 80. Performances generally last between 6 and 6½ minutes.

Chabrier made two transcriptions of España:
 Song for soprano and piano
 Two pianos

Other appearances
Parts of España feature prominently in Émile Waldteufel's waltz España of 1886. It is also the basis of the melody of the 1956 American popular song "Hot Diggity (Dog Ziggity Boom)" by Al Hoffman and Dick Manning.

In 1961 Roland Petit created a ballet entitled España using the score of Emmanuel Chabrier; costumes were by Yves Saint Laurent.

References

External links

Compositions by Emmanuel Chabrier
Compositions for symphony orchestra
Compositions for two pianos
Rhapsodies
1883 compositions